ComiConverse is an Internet News site, focusing on comics, TV, film, and games.

History
The website started in January 2015 as a reliable source in the comics and pop-culture space. ComiConverse hired writers with background in the industry to cover different topics related to their categories.

Over the course of 2 years, the website has been covered and quoted as an authentic source by The Hollywood Reporter, The New York Times, Entrepreneur and Forbes among a number of other major outlets and magazines.

ComiConverse is specifically quoted as a reliable source that holds exclusive interviews of actors such as an interview with Roger Ashton-Griffiths of Game of Thrones quoted by WinterIsComing.net and the interview with Jason O'Mara of Agents of SHIELD.

Reception
ComiConverse, as an engagement website, has been taken as an example by Forbes for its jumping to trends using social media hashtags in order to get better engagement from its viewers.

References

External links
Official website

American entertainment news websites
Websites about comics